"A Better Man" is a song by English hard rock band Thunder, released as a single in 1993, taken from their album Laughing on Judgement Day. It is the only Thunder song in which Gary James plays acoustic guitar instead of his usual drums. It is also the only song he sings a part of live, as he occasionally sings the song's final line.

The song is the band's highest-charting UK single, reaching No. 18 on the UK Singles Chart in February 1993.

Track listing
Maxi-CD
 "A Better Man" – 3:43
 "Bigger Than Both of Us" – 4:26
 "Higher Ground" (live) – 5:35
 "Lazy Sunday Afternoon" (live) – 3:31

Charts

References

1992 songs
1993 singles
EMI Records singles
Thunder (band) songs